Alcimenes can refer to a number of people in Greek mythology and history:

Mythology
Alcimenes, a Boeotian prince as the son of King Glaucus of Potniae and possibly, Eurymede or Eurynome, daughter of King Nisus of Megara. He was unintentionally killed by his own brother Bellerophon.  According to some traditions, he was called Deliades or Peiren.
Alcimedes, one of the sons of Jason and Medea.  When Jason subsequently wanted to marry Glauce, his sons Alcimenes and Tisander were murdered by Medea, and were afterwards buried by Jason in the sanctuary of Hera at Corinth.
History
Alcimenes, an Athenian comic poet, apparently a contemporary of Aeschylus.  One of his pieces is supposed to have been titled "The Female Swimmers".  His works were greatly admired by Tynnichus, a younger contemporary of Aeschylus.
Alcimenes, a tragic writer who was a native of Megara, mentioned in the Suda.

Notes

References 

Apollodorus, The Library with an English Translation by Sir James George Frazer, F.B.A., F.R.S. in 2 Volumes, Cambridge, MA, Harvard University Press; London, William Heinemann Ltd. 1921. ISBN 0-674-99135-4. Online version at the Perseus Digital Library. Greek text available from the same website.
Diodorus Siculus, The Library of History translated by Charles Henry Oldfather. Twelve volumes. Loeb Classical Library. Cambridge, Massachusetts: Harvard University Press; London: William Heinemann, Ltd. 1989. Vol. 3. Books 4.59–8. Online version at Bill Thayer's Web Site
Diodorus Siculus, Bibliotheca Historica. Vol 1-2. Immanel Bekker. Ludwig Dindorf. Friedrich Vogel. in aedibus B. G. Teubneri. Leipzig. 1888-1890. Greek text available at the Perseus Digital Library.
Gaius Julius Hyginus, Fabulae from The Myths of Hyginus translated and edited by Mary Grant. University of Kansas Publications in Humanistic Studies. Online version at the Topos Text Project.
Hesiod, Catalogue of Women from Homeric Hymns, Epic Cycle, Homerica translated by Evelyn-White, H G. Loeb Classical Library Volume 57. London: William Heinemann, 1914. Online version at theio.com
Smith, William, ed. (1870). "Alcemines". Dictionary of Greek and Roman Biography and Mythology. vol 1, page 101
Suida, Suda Encyclopedia translated by Ross Scaife, David Whitehead, William Hutton, Catharine Roth, Jennifer Benedict, Gregory Hays, Malcolm Heath Sean M. Redmond, Nicholas Fincher, Patrick Rourke, Elizabeth Vandiver, Raphael Finkel, Frederick Williams, Carl Widstrand, Robert Dyer, Joseph L. Rife, Oliver Phillips and many others. Online version at the Topos Text Project.

Children of Medea
Children of Jason
Boeotian city-states
Corinthian characters in Greek mythology
Boeotian mythology
Corinthian mythology
Ancient Megarians
Ancient Greek writers known only from secondary sources
Old Comic poets
Tragic poets